Christian Essig (born January 24, 1986) is a retired German footballer.

Career

Coaching career
In January 2019, Essig started his coaching career at his former club 1. FC Heidenheim, where he was appointed youth coach. As of the 2022-23 season, he was still in the same position.

References

External links

1986 births
Living people
German footballers
Karlsruher SC II players
SV Sandhausen players
1. FC Heidenheim players
SV Babelsberg 03 players
3. Liga players
FV Illertissen players
Association football midfielders
People from Rastatt
Sportspeople from Karlsruhe (region)
Footballers from Baden-Württemberg